Spiritism in Costa Rica refers to the spiritual trend that emerged in Costa Rica at the beginning of the 20th century and of which renowned figures of the intellectual and political elite were followers. 

Since 1874, the vicar Domingo Rivas has already warned from the pulpit against the circulation of spiritist literature by Allan Kardec in the country. Although the exact beginning of spiritism in Costa Rica is unknown, since 1896 there has been at least one occult circle that publishes the magazine Grano de Arena (Graine of Corn), edited by a barber from Alajuela, a painter and an artisan named Domingo Núñez, Agustín Ramos and Pedro Pérez respectively. The magazine declared itself to be rationalist and was strongly critical of Catholicism. It stopped being printed in 1889 due to lack of funds.

Among the people linked to the publication are the Nicaraguan lawyer Salvador Jirón, the educator Amadeo Madriz (tutor of the writers Manuel González Zeledón and Carlos Gagini), General Federico Fernández (brother of the president and Freemason Próspero Fernández and father of the intellectual and theosophist Rogelio Fernández Güell), the politician Francisco Boza, the Colombian Francisco Lamus and the Spanish businessman Antonio Rodríguez, and women, such as Celina Fernández Giralt and María Rojas. In 1896 the Benefactor Society for Psychological Studies was mentioned for the first time in El Grano, which would connect with international spiritist organizations, particularly in Spain, and would distribute the Revista de Estudios Psicológicas de Barcelona in the country, as well as articles from El Grano would be published abroad.

At the beginning of the 20th century, spiritism would attract the attention of different thinkers, disenchanted both with scientific positivism, of which they were critical for its materialism, and with traditional religiosity, especially Catholic religion, which they called superstitious. Being Omar Dengo one of these, and who wrote an article on the death of the chemist and spiritist William Crookes. Costa Rican spiritists in general sought to apply a scientific and rationalist methodology to spiritism, distrusting what they considered trickery. among the Figures who were interested in spiritism include Omar Dengo, Foreign Minister Ricardo Fernández Guardia, magistrate Alberto Brenes Córdoba, painter Enrique Echandi, future dictators brothers Federico and José Joaquín Tinoco and the esoteric scholar Rogelio Fernández Güell who, according to Abelardo Bonilla, was initiated into spiritualism by Mexican President Francisco I. Madero.

Spiritism was quickly denounced by different Catholic clergy accusing it of Satanism. In 1906 the Franklin Circle of Spiritists was formed, which studied the abilities of the medium of Ofelia Corrales, daughter of the educator Buenaventura Corrales. In 1911 the Claros de Luna Spiritist Center was formed directed by the future director of the National Museum (under the government of Tinoco) and director of the Colegio Superior de Men, Ramiro Aguilar, and who publishes a magazine of the same name as of 1923. Its members included the future Minister of Education Napoleón Quesada, Daniel González Víquez (brother of President Cleto González Víquez), Rómulo Tovar, Moises Vincenzi and the future Minister of Education and director of the Colegio Superior de Señoritas Salvador Umaña.

Between 1921 and 1923, spiritist circles had been created in Puntarenas, Limón, Goicoechea and Mora. In 1925, the Center for the Study of Experimental Psychology was founded, which published the monthly magazine El Estudio between November 1925 and October 1928.

References

Spiritism
Religion in Costa Rica